Lanzhou Jiaotong University is a transport university in Lanzhou, Gansu Province, China.

It was founded as a railway engineering university as a collaboration of Southwest Jiaotong University, Beijing Jiaotong University, and the Chinese Ministry of Railways. In 2003, it changed its name from 'Lanzhou Railway University' to its current name.

Schools
 Civil Engineering 
 Automatization and Electric Engineering
 Electronics and Information Engineering
 Mechatronic Engineering
 Environmental and Municipal Engineering
 Economics and Management
 Traffic and Transportation
 Chemical and Biological Engineering
 Foreign Languages
 Mathematics, Physics and Software Engineering
 Architecture and Urban Planning
 Art and Design
 Continuing Education
 International Joint Education

References

 About Lanzhou Jiaotong University

Universities and colleges in Gansu
Technical universities and colleges in China
Educational institutions established in 1958
1958 establishments in China
Jiaotong University
Railway schools